Maude Mathys, née Küng (born 14 January 1987), from Ollon is a Swiss ski mountaineer and trail runner. She is currently member of the SAC-CAS Swiss Team 2. She is also competing in ultramarathon events.

In 2015 Mathys was reprimanded for an ADRV for using clomiphene, a fertility drug which features on the WADA Prohibited List under section S4: Hormone and Metabolic Modulators. Mathys was let off with a warning as the drug was being taken in the hope of getting pregnant.

Selected results 
 2012:
 3rd, European Championship, team, together with Émilie Gex-Fabry
 4th, European Championship, vertical race
 1st, 2017 European Mountain Running Championships.

References

External links 
 Mathys, Maude, Ultra Marathon Statistics, DUV

1987 births
Living people
Swiss female ski mountaineers
Swiss female long-distance runners
Swiss ultramarathon runners
People from Aigle District
Doping cases in athletics
Swiss sportspeople in doping cases
Female ultramarathon runners
Swiss female mountain runners
Sportspeople from the canton of Vaud